Ruralco is a diversified agricultural company that provides real estate, insurance, auctioneer services, agricultural equipment and other services to the Australian rural community. Ruralco became a wholly owned subsidiary of Canadian company Nutrien in 2019.

History
Ruralco was founded in 1970. By 2001 it had 384 rural supply stores under the brands CRT and Town & Country. In September of that year it merged with Grow Force Australia.

In May 2006 it reverse merged with Australia's oldest publicly listed company, Tasmanian agricultural corporation Roberts Limited.

It sold Monds and Affleck feed supplies to the Ridley Corporation in 2011.

In 2008 it was described as having quietly begun to rival the 'big two' of agricultural industry in Australia, Elders Limited and Landmark. By 2014 it owned 10.1% of Elders, unsuccessfully attempting to purchase the rural services section of Elders for 250 million in 2013. Following falling profits from Elders and the knockback of its purchase offer, it sold all 10.1% of the company.

In February 2014 it acquired Total Eden, a water supplies company, from Anchorage Capital Partners for AUD$57.4 million.

Takeover and delisting from ASX 
In June 2019, Agrium Australia Pty Ltd (formerly Landmark, now a wholly owned subsidiary of Canadian company Nutrien) announced the proposed acquisition of Ruralco.

Ruralco shareholders voted overwhelmingly in favour of the $469 million takeover and Ruralco was delisted from the Australian Securities Exchange on 1 October 2019.

Under the new ownership, Ruralco's operations are to be rebranded Nutrien Ag Solutions.

Subsidiaries
Subsidiaries of Ruralco include;

 Combined Rural Traders
 Grow Force Australia
 CQ Agricultural Services
 Total Eden
 Frontier International
 BGa AgriServices
 Archards Irrigation
 Dairy Livestock Services
 Peter Dargan Livestock
 Territory Rural Mcpherson
 BR and C Agents
 Southern Australian Livestock
 Rodwells
 Rawlinson and Brown
 Savage Barker & Backhouse
 Primaries of WA
 Davidson Cameron
 The Farm Shop

Joint ownership
 AgFarm (with CHS Inc.)
 Grant Daniel & Long (with Grant Daniel & Long)

Other acquisitions
 Murray River Wholesalers

References

Business services companies established in 1970
Companies based in Hobart
Conglomerate companies established in 1970
1970 establishments in Australia